WRZZ is a Classic rock formatted broadcast radio station licensed to Parkersburg, West Virginia, United States, serving the Parkersburg/Marietta area.  WRZZ is owned and operated by Burbach Broadcasting Co. The station is an affiliate of the syndicated Pink Floyd program "Floydian Slip."

External links
Z-106 Online

RZZ